This is a list of charities accused of ties to terrorism. A number of charities have been accused or convicted in court of using their revenues to fund terrorism or revolutionary movements, rather than for the humanitarian purposes for which contributions were ostensibly collected. During the "war on terror" the names of several such organisations have been published, although the phenomenon predates 9/11. Some detainees have been captured largely because they volunteered or worked for these charities.

On August 23, 2007, the Bush Administration announced plans to implement enhanced security checking of the employees of American charities, which receive funds from U.S. Agency for International Development, looking for those who might have ties to terrorism.
Charities which are turned down will not be offered an explanation, or an avenue to appeal the decisions.

Charities accused of ties to terrorism
{| class="wikitable"
|-
! Name || Headquarters || Accusers || Notes
|-
| Afghan Support Committee || ||  U.S. State Department || 
 Alleged to have funneled support to fighters in Afghanistan.
|-
| Al-Haramain Foundation || ||  U.S. State Department || 
 Suspicion fell on Guantanamo detainee Jamal Muhammad Alawi Mar'i, in part, because he was a volunteer for Al Haramain
|-
| Al Kifah Refugee Center || ||  Spanish police || 
 Alleged to have served as a covert funnel for US support of those resisting the Soviet–Afghan War.
 Alleged to have trained fighters destined to serve in Afghanistan under Osama bin Laden.
 Alleged to have provided military and demolition training to those who bombed the World Trade Center in 1993.
|-
| Al Wafa al Igatha al Islamia || ||  U.S. State Department || 
 Suspicion fell on Guantanamo detainee Jamal Muhammad Alawi Mar'i, in part, because he was a volunteer for Al Wafa
|-
| Benevolence International Foundation || ||  Federal Bureau of Investigation || 
 Alleged to have helped fund the 1993 World Trade Center bombing.
 Placed on the Terrorist exclusion list.
|-
| Bosanska Idealna Futura || ||  Federal Bureau of Investigation|| 
 Branch of the Chicago United States-based Benevolence International Foundation.
 Shut down on US request in 2002
|-
| Global Relief Foundation || ||  Federal Bureau of Investigation||
 Bosnian offices shut down on US request in 2002
 Commission of the European Union froze assets in 2006
|-
| Health and Education Project International || ||  Canadian Security Intelligence Service || 
 Founded by Ahmed Khadr after Human Concern International cut its ties to him
|-
| Holy Land Foundation for Relief and Development || ||  Federal Bureau of Investigation||
 On November 10, 2004, convicted by US federal court of funding Hamas. In 2001 it was the largest Muslim charity in the United States.
|-
| İnsan Hak ve Hürriyetleri ve İnsani Yardım Vakfı ||  || ||
 Alleged to have sent weapons and supplies to extremists in Syria during the Syrian Civil War.
|-
| International Islamic Relief Organization || ||  U.S. State Department||
 Sued by families of the victims of the September 11 attacks
|-
|International Relief Fund for the Afflicted and Needy (IRFAN-Canada)
|
| Canadian Revenue Agency
|
 Alleged to have transferred $14.6 million worth of resources to Hamas through various associated organizations.
|-
| Interpal || ||
 United States Treasury Department

||

 Accusation by US Treasury Department (2003)
 British government's Charity Commission for England and Wales (2003) found no evidence to support allegations of connection to terrorism.
(Note: in 1997 Sunday Telegraph retracted accusations Interpal was run by Hamas activists; in 2003 the Board of Deputies of British Jews repeated such allegations, retracting them after it was sued by Interpal; in 2010 Sunday Express issued an apology and made an out-of-court settlement for libel for making similar allegations.)

|-
| Internationale Humanitäre Hilfsorganisation e.V. 
| 
| German Interior Ministry
|
 Outlawed in Germany since it has financially supported Hamas, while presenting activities to donors as humanitarian help.
|-
| Islamic Relief
| 
|,    
|
Alleged to have funded Hamas and alleged connections to Muslim Brotherhood. Islamic Relief is contesting the Israeli allegations and publicly refutes any alleged links to the Muslim Brotherhood. 
|-
| Jamaat al Dawa al Quran || ||  JTF-GTMO ||
 American counter-terrorism analysts at Guantanamo assert this group is an extremist militant group.
|-
| Jamat al Tabligh<ref name=CsrbLetters6pg4>Combatant Status Review Board Letters, final release (.pdf), Department of Defense Freedom of Information Office -- see page 4 of the .pdf</ref> || ||  U.S. State Department|| 
 "The Jamat al Tabligh, a Pakistani-based Islamic Missionary organization, is being used as a cover to mask travel and activities of terrorists including members of al-Qaeda"
|-
| Maktab al-Khidamat || ||  U.S. 9-11 commission || 
 Alleged to have been transformed by Osama bin Laden into Al Qaeda.
|-
| Muslim Aid || ||  Spanish police,   || 
 Alleged to have funded mujahideen fighters to Bosnia, Union of Good, Islamist militants of Bangladesh.
|-
| Society of the Revival of Islamic Heritage|| ||  U.S. State Department|| 
 Appears on the United States State Department list of Foreign Terrorist Organizations
|-
|Popular Front of India
|
| Various Indian authorities
|
 Accused of Radical Islamism, Islamic terrorism
|-
| Tamils Rehabilitation Organisation(TRO) || ||  Federal Bureau of Investigation|| 
 Liberation Tigers of Tamil Eelam
|-
| Tamil (Sri Lanka) Refugee-Aid Society of Ottawa || ||  Canadian Revenue Agency|| 
 Liberation Tigers of Tamil Eelam
|}

See also
 Terrorist financing
 Funding Evil Alms for Jihad''

References

 
Covert organizations
Charities
Funding of terrorism